Hughesdale may refer to:

 Hughesdale, Victoria, Australia; a suburb of Melbourne
 Hughesdale railway station, Melbourne, Victoria, Australia
 Hughesdale, Rhode Island, USA; a neighborhood of Johnston

See also

 
 Hughes (disambiguation)
 Hugh (disambiguation)
 Dale (disambiguation)